Josef Schuster (13 December 1906 – 1996) was a German weightlifter. He competed in the men's bantamweight event at the 1952 Summer Olympics.

References

External links
 

1906 births
1996 deaths
German male weightlifters
Olympic weightlifters of Germany
Weightlifters at the 1952 Summer Olympics
People from Ebersberg (district)
Sportspeople from Upper Bavaria